Events from the year 1614 in France.

Incumbents 
Monarch: Louis XIII
Regent: Marie de' Medici (until 27 September)

Events
 
 
 
 
 
 

 The French Estates General meets for the last time before the era of the French Revolution. In the interim, the Kingdom of France will be governed as an absolute monarchy.

Births
 Brother Lawrence of the Resurrection

Deaths
 

 
 July 1 – Isaac Casaubon, French-born classical scholar (b. 1559)
 July 15 – Pierre de Bourdeille, seigneur de Brantôme, French historian and biographer

See also

References

1610s in France